Spencer Fox (born May 10, 1993) is an American musician, singer, and former child actor. He is best known as the voice of Dash Parr in the 2004 animated film The Incredibles, and as the lead guitarist for the indie rock band Charly Bliss, which he co-founded in 2011.

Early life
Fox was born in New York City, New York on May 10, 1993. He is the son of actor Carey Fox.

Career
Fox began his career as a child actor, at ten years old. He provided the voice of Dash Parr in The Incredibles, and again in the Disney on Ice show Disney Presents Pixar's The Incredibles in a Magic Kingdom Adventure. He also provided the voices of Jim and Tim Possible for the fourth season of Kim Possible, and he was the voice of Mudbud in the first Air Buddies movie.

Fox was signed to the "Woozy Tribe" and has played some one-off shows in the NYC area. As of 2014, Fox is a member of the power pop band Charly Bliss as a vocalist and guitarist.

Personal life
Fox attended Farragut Middle School in Hastings-on-Hudson, New York, and Staples High School in Westport, Connecticut. Fox studied literature at the State University of New York at Purchase. In his spare time, Fox went under the moniker "Slates" and was a solo musician.

Discography
A Lot to Say (2013)
Soft Serve EP (2014)
Ruby (2016)
Turd (2016)
Glitter (2017)
Guppy (2017)
Young Enough (2019)

Filmography

Film

Television

Video games

Music videos

References

External links
 

1993 births
Living people
21st-century American comedians
21st-century American male actors
21st-century American singers
American male child actors
American male film actors
American male television actors
American male voice actors
Comedians from New York City
Male actors from New York City
Staples High School alumni